Mohamed Dione (born 25 May 1948) is a Senegalese judoka. He competed in the men's half-heavyweight event at the 1972 Summer Olympics.

References

1948 births
Living people
Senegalese male judoka
Olympic judoka of Senegal
Judoka at the 1972 Summer Olympics
Place of birth missing (living people)
African Games medalists in judo
Competitors at the 1978 All-Africa Games
African Games bronze medalists for Senegal